The Pennsylvania Railroad's class FF1 was an American electric locomotive, a prototype numbered #3931 and nicknamed "Big Liz".  It was built in 1917 to haul freight trains across the Allegheny Mountains where the PRR planned to electrify.  "Big Liz" proved workable but too powerful for the freight cars of the time with its 4600 available horsepower and astonishing  of tractive effort.  Pulling the train it regularly snapped couplers and when moved to the rear as a pusher its force was sufficient to pop cars in the middle of the train off the tracks.

It had a 2-6-6-2 wheel arrangement in two half-frames, connected in the center. Each frame had a pair of three-phase AC induction motors driving a jackshaft through gearing and a spring drive; side rods then drove the wheels. The jackshafts can be mistaken for an additional fourth axle but the "wheels" are cogwheels to transfer power from the motors to the jackshaft. Three-phase power for the 4 massive motors was supplied from the single phase overhead supply via a large rotary converter housed in the body of the locomotive. With three-phase induction motors there was no way to control the speed of the motors;  changing the wiring of the motor poles allowed for two speed settings, which were considered enough to drag heavy freight trains up and down steep grades.

Its intended use as an Allegheny climber never realized and its power too much for the rolling stock in service at the time, Big Liz was sidelined until being cut up for scrap in 1940.

References 
 
 
 

11 kV AC locomotives
FF1
1′C+C1′ locomotives
Experimental locomotives
Individual locomotives of the United States
Electric locomotives of the United States
Unique locomotives
Scrapped locomotives
Standard gauge locomotives of the United States
Railway locomotives introduced in 1917